Skegness railway station serves the seaside resort of Skegness in Lincolnshire, England at the terminus of the Poacher Line.

The station is now owned by Network Rail and managed by East Midlands Railway, who provide all rail services that run to and from Nottingham.

History

The line to Wainfleet was opened in August 1871 by the Wainfleet and Firsby Railway. This line was then extended to Skegness; the station opened on 28 July 1873.

Skegness was dubbed "the Blackpool of the East Coast" or "Nottingham by the Sea" and has a mascot, the Jolly Fisherman (designed by John Hassall in 1908 for the Great Northern Railway) and a slogan - "Skegness is so bracing" - a reference to the chilly prevailing north-easterly winds that can and frequently do blow off the North Sea. A statue of The Jolly Fisherman now greets passengers as they arrive at the station when entering through the main entrance.

Up until 1966, the railway station had a goods yard with sheds; however, this area along with platform one was demolished between 1980 and 1983. This area is now used as a car park belonging to nearby offices. There was a Seacroft railway station located just outside Skegness, but this has also now closed. The next station on the line is Havenhouse.
In 2006, all locomotive hauled services to Skegness were halted due to the weight of the locos buckling the rails frequently; however, this ban has since been lifted after Network Rail began a track renewal scheme which is now entering the final phase.

Station Masters

William J. Haslam 1873 - 1882 (afterwards station master at Wood Green)
George Tuckerman 1881 - 1899
George Henry Dales 1900 - 1906 (afterwards stationmaster at Horncastle)
George Chambers 1906 - 1921 (formerly station master at Littleworth)
William Mountain 1921  - 1929 (formerly station master at Woodhall Junction)
Herbert Joseph Osborn 1930 - 1943 (formerly station master at Woodhall Junction)
W.E. Olle 1943 - 1953
J.H. Howden 1953 - ????

Services

As of May 2022, there is an hourly service to Nottingham (via Grantham) on weekdays and Saturdays, although certain peak services bypass Grantham and continue straight to Nottingham.

On summer Sundays, some services start and terminate at Mansfield Woodhouse. In the winter, a limited service operates (four departures per day, all after midday).

Present day
The current station has toilet facilities with a baby change and a specialist service for the disabled and a small refreshment/newsagent stall. There is 24-hour CCTV in operation at this station and there are staff patrolling the concourse area to give information when trains are due to arrive or depart. There is also a ticket office, staffed for part of the traffic day and a self-service ticket vending machine (TVM) has been installed; this also enables customers who have booked their tickets online to collect them outside office hours.

Six platforms remain in place (numbered 2 to 7), however platforms 2 and 7 are now out of use and in practice only two platforms (3 and 4) are used regularly.

Remodelling 2011
Network Rail and Lincolnshire County Council announced a major renovation programme costing £290,000, which has seen the derelict buildings demolished, the customer toilets being modernised and the gents relocated. There was much debate in Skegness about the old stationmaster's house being part of Skegness' heritage and should have been refurbished rather than demolished.

Local transport connections

Skegness railway station has good links to local public transport with a taxi rank at the front of the station.
	 
Adjacent to the railway station is the town's bus station which has services in all directions, including frequent buses up the coast as far as Mablethorpe, Louth and Alford all year round.

References

External links

 1950s video of diesel unit arriving at Skegness (at end of video)

Railway stations in Lincolnshire
DfT Category E stations
Former Great Northern Railway stations
Railway stations in Great Britain opened in 1873
Railway stations served by East Midlands Railway
Skegness